Direct Heiress is a 1982 Soviet drama film directed by Sergey Solovyev.

Plot 
The film tells about an unusual girl who considers herself the direct heiress of Pushkin. For her, adult relationships are false and empty. And suddenly a friend of her father, along with his son, comes to visit them.

Cast 
 Tatyana Kovshova
 Tatyana Drubich
 Aleksandr Zbruyev	
 Sergey Shakurov
 Igor Nefyodov
 Andrei Yuritsyn
 German Shorr
 Anna Sidorkina
 Aleksandr Porokhovshchikov	
 Sergei Plotnikov

References

External links 
 

1982 films
1980s Russian-language films
Soviet drama films
1982 drama films